Lost Lake is an unincorporated community in Tunica County, Mississippi, United States.

Notes

Unincorporated communities in Tunica County, Mississippi
Unincorporated communities in Mississippi